Archie Watkins (born 15 September 1989) is a Fijian international footballer who plays for Suva, as a defender.

Career
Watkins has played for Nadroga, Rewa and Suva.

He earned 3 caps for the Fijian national team in 2011.

References

1989 births
Living people
Fijian footballers
Fiji international footballers
Nadroga F.C. players
Rewa F.C. players
Suva F.C. players
Association football defenders
2012 OFC Nations Cup players